Mirza Ghazi Beg Tarkhan (r. 1599–1612 CE) of the Tarkhan dynasty in Sindh ruled from the capital city of Thatta. He was the most powerful Mughal governor who administered Sindh, during whose rule the region had become fiercely loyal to the Mughals. In Sindh a network of small and large forts manned by cavalry and musketeers further extended Mughal power during the reign of Mughal Emperor Shah Jahan. 

He was a descendant of the powerful Mirza clan which had arrived in the region with the Mughal emperor Babur who had conquered South Asia in 1526. Mirza Ghazi Beg spoke nearly two languages which included Persian (the official and native language of the Mughals), and some Turkic.

He is remembered for the completion of the monumental Shah Jahan Mosque built in 1647-49 at Thatta, he is also credited for introducing the Sindhi Abjad (new Sindhi alphabets alongside the original Arabic Alphabets). He was a charismatic leader who had a deep passion for Horse-back archery and Sufi teachings. Mirza Ghazi Beg took action against the rebellious Hindu Brahmans. Debal the port along the coastal area of Thatta was attacked by the Portuguese Admiral Fernão Mendes Pinto in an attempt to capture or destroy the Ottoman vessels anchored there, the port was heavy damaged and a large Mughal force armed with muskets was deployed on the shores to avoid such attacks and landings by the Portuguese.

References

Mughal nobility
Persian-language poets
Indian Muslims
People from Thatta District
Mughal Empire poets